The 2017–18 Montana Lady Griz basketball team represents the University of Montana during the 2017–18 NCAA Division I women's basketball season. The Lady Griz are led by second year head coach Shannon Schweyen, play their home games at Dahlberg Arena and were members of the Big Sky Conference. They finished the season 14–17, 9–9 in Big Sky play to finish in a tie for seventh place. They advanced to the quarterfinals of the Big Sky women's tournament where they lost to Northern Colorado.

Roster

Schedule
Source 

|-
!colspan=9 style=| Exhibition

|-
!colspan=9 style=| Non-conference regular season

|-
!colspan=9 style=| Big Sky regular season

|-
!colspan=9 style=| Big Sky Women's Tournament

See also
 2017–18 Montana Grizzlies basketball team

References

Montana Lady Griz basketball seasons
Montana
Lady
Lady